Squishmallows is a brand of stuffed toy that was launched in 2017 by Kelly Toys Holdings LLC. Squishmallows are round and come in a variety of colors, sizes, animals, and textures. The brand has created over 1,000 Squishmallows characters with unique names and background stories. Depending on the size and store, prices can range between $3-$50 but rarer collections are often priced higher.

History

Founders 
Kelly Toys Holdings, headquartered in Los Angeles, California, was founded in 1986 by Jonathan Kelly. In an interview with Yahoo! Finance, Kelly stated that he came up with the idea for Squishmallows when he went to Japan and saw a variety of appealing toy products, including plush toys. Kelly and his team then spent several months creating a toy that emulated the “soft, cute, and kawaii” look of the Japanese plush toys. After collaborating for one year, Kelly Toys Holdings was acquired by Jazwares Inc, a privately owned company, in 2018. Thus, Kelly Toys Holdings expanded its position in the market for toys and obtained opportunities to get further licenses for the brand. Kelly Toys Holdings was Jazwares’ second acquisition following their acquisition of Wicked Cool Toys.

Popularity 
Squishmallows first gained success during the COVID-19 pandemic in 2020 through social media outlets, like TikTok, where Squishmallow collectors would post about their plush toy collections. The TikTok hashtag #Squishmallows has gained over 550 million views. Squishmallows has acquired nearly 100,000 followers on Twitter and nearly 500,000 followers on Instagram. Almost 2 years after launching Squishmallows, Kelly Toys Holdings has sold over 50 million units.

The company has made a link with Monopoly and created a monopoly board involving purchasing squishmallows instead of properties. The game also includes a special version of Cam the Cat which can only be found in this game.

Product

Materials 
Squishmallows are made from soft spandex and filled with polyester fiber. As mentioned by Squishmallows on their Twitter account, they are manufactured in China. Squishmallows originally came in four sizes, but are now sold in 12 different sizes ranging from a clip-on 3.5 inches to a large 24 inches. Squishmallows shouldn't be submerged, as it affects the fabric and stuffing of the pillow. Spot cleaning with a stain-removing pen or a wet washcloth is recommended. Following this, the drying temperature should not be too hot to avoid damaging the polyester filling. Authentic Squishmallows can be identified by their three attached tags. Squishmallows have also extended their line to include HugMees, Squish-Doos, Heroes, Flip-A-Mallows, Squishville, Mystery Squad, Micromallows, and Stackables.

Retailers 
Squishmallows were originally sold directly through the KellyToys website and later became available in retail locations through partnerships with stores such as Walgreens. Squishmallows can now be found in many stores including Costco, Walgreens, CVS, Kroger, Hot Topic, London Drugs, Five Below, GameStop, Walmart, and Hamrick's, and more.  The higher-priced and more high-end Squishmallows are sold at Hallmark while the more cost-efficient Squishmallows are typically found at Costco, Target, and Walmart. Squishmallows are sold in Canada, Mexico, the United States, the United Kingdom, and Australia.

Pricing and collectability 
Due to the demand for the toy, Squishmallows are often sold by resellers for an increased price. The average resell price for a Squishmallow depends on the size, condition, and rarity of the specific item. Some limited edition or high-demand Squishmallows are sold by resellers and collectors for hundreds or thousands of dollars. Jack the Black Cat, known for its closed white eyes and white whiskers, is one of the rarest Squishmallows sold to date. KellyToys introduced the limited edition stuffed animal on their website in 2020, where it sold out within two hours. Third party websites like eBay host listings for Jack the Black Cat valued at nearly $2,000. Among the many Squishmallows that are sold, some of the most popular include Connor the Cow, Malcolm the Mushroom, Archie the Axolotl, and Philippe the Frog. There are reports that resellers are harassed and doxxed by the community.

Event-exclusive Squishmallows 
Event-exclusive Squishmallows are Squishmallows that are only awarded as prizes in the events such as Select Series: Lamont Sweepstakes or Trading Card Sweepstakes. Event-exclusive Squishmallows are generally considered rare and the odds of winning can be as low as approximately 1 in 10,000 such as the prize for Squishmallows Trading Card Sweepstakes: JSK Business Cat.

Charity work 
Kelly Toys Holdings has a charitable donation program called Kelly Toys Care where Kelly Toys Holding’s employees would volunteer to host charitable events and donate toys to anyone that needs comfort. According to Kelly Toys Care, they value “Education, Inclusion, and Mental Health and Wellness.” They also want to support any charitable organizations around the world with the same mission and spread awareness regarding mental health.

Awards

References

External links
 

Stuffed toys
Toy brands
2010s toys
2020s toys
Toy animals
Products introduced in 2017